Kenneth Jerome Kennard (born October 4, 1954 in Fort Worth, Texas) is a former American football defensive lineman in the National Football League. He was signed by the Houston Oilers as an undrafted free agent in 1977 where he played until 1983. He played college football at Angelo State.

References 

1954 births
Living people
American football defensive tackles
American football defensive ends
Angelo State Rams football players
Houston Oilers players